John Richard Green (born 7 March 1958) is a former footballer who scored 17 goals from 478 appearances in the Football League playing as a centre back for Rotherham United (two spells), Scunthorpe United and Darlington in the 1970s and 1980s.

References

1958 births
Living people
Footballers from Rotherham
English footballers
Association football defenders
Rotherham United F.C. players
Scunthorpe United F.C. players
Darlington F.C. players
English Football League players